Damash Gilan Volleyball Club was an Iranian professional volleyball team based in Rasht, Iran. The team is owned by Amir Abedini. They competed in the Iranian Volleyball Super League. Damash was dissolved after Presence Three year in volleyball Super League.

Notable former players
  Miroslav Gradinarov
  Danail Milushev
  Arash Keshavarzi
  Mehdi Mahdavi
  Mohammad Mohammad-Kazem
  Alireza Nadi
  Hamzeh Zarini
  Saeed Marouf

External links
 Damash Gilan Site
  Damash Gilan Fan Site
 Roster

Iranian volleyball clubs
Sport in Gilan Province